Élder da Silva Granja or simply Élder Granja (born July 2, 1982 in Santos), is a Brazilian right wingback, who currently plays for Madureira.

Career 
After terminating his contract with Palmeiras, the right wingback has signed a one-season deal with Clube Atlético Mineiro on 3 April 2009.

Honours
Rio Grande do Sul State League: 2003, 2004
Libertadores Cup: 2006
FIFA Club World Championship: 2006

External links

1982 births
Living people
Sportspeople from Santos, São Paulo
Brazilian footballers
Santos FC players
Atlético Clube Goianiense players
Sport Club Corinthians Alagoano players
Associação Portuguesa de Desportos players
Sport Club Internacional players
Sociedade Esportiva Palmeiras players
Clube Atlético Mineiro players
Sport Club do Recife players
CR Vasco da Gama players
Club Athletico Paranaense players
Associação Desportiva São Caetano players
Esporte Clube Juventude players
Association football defenders